Vissani is a village in the municipal unit of Delvinaki, Ioannina regional unit, Epirus, Greece.  It is situated in the mountainous Pogoni area near the Albanian border, at 750 m above sea level. A small road connects Vissani with the Greek National Road 22 Kakavia - Kalpaki.

Population

History

Vissani was founded in the 14th century, and grew during Ottoman rule. It became a part of Greece after the Balkan Wars in 1913. The village retains elements of its traditional architecture. In the center of the village is the church of Saint Nicholas from 1791, decorated with frescoes. The village houses were built by craftsmen from the villages of Pyrsogianni and Vourbiani. Vissani is the birthplace of Kitsos Harisiadis, one of the greatest traditional clarinetists of Epirus, who mastered and taught the tradition of playing the "miroloi".

See also

List of settlements in the Ioannina regional unit

References

External links
Vissani at the GTP Travel Pages

Populated places in Ioannina (regional unit)